Bliss is the second studio album by Australian pop singer, Nikki Webster. It was released in Australia on 28 October 2002 (see 2002 in music) through BMG/Gotham Records. Bliss was recorded in one week, earlier that year. Nikki said:" My voice (in Bliss) has aged since Follow Your Heart." The album peaked at No.16 on the ARIA Albums Chart.

An early version of Bliss included a bonus DVD featuring the music videos for "Strawberry Kisses", "Depend on Me", "The Best Days", "Something More Beautiful" and "24/7 (Crazy 'bout Your Smile)".

Track listing
"24/7 (Crazy 'bout Your Smile)" (Daniel Eklund, Paul Rein) – 3:17
"Something More Beautiful" (Johan Åberg, Rein) – 3:31
"Mmm...I Like!" (Åberg, Rein) – 3:19
"Never Been Kissed" (Pelle Ankarberg, Jodi Marr, Niclas Molinder, Joacim Persson) – 3:47
"To Have to Let Go" (Chris Braide, Emma Bunton, Andrew Frampton) – 4:15
"I Think I Do" (Janski, Lars Johansen) – 3:23
"Perfect Bliss" (Jörgen Elofsson, Phil Thornalley) – 3:58
"Positivity" (Henrik Åhlgren, Jo Evans) – 3:07
"Miracle of You" (Jeff Franzel, Andrew Fromm, Sandy Linzer) – 4:28
"I Sing for You" (Martin Briley, Dana Calitri, Andy Marvel) – 3:32
"Only When I Need You" (Åberg, Rein, Winston Sela) – 4:27
"Fairytale Believer" (Franzel, Marjorie Maye, Andy Snitzer) – 3:37

DVD
"Strawberry Kisses"
"Depend on Me"
"The Best Days"
"Something More Beautiful"
"24/7 (Crazy 'bout Your Smile)"

Charts and certifications

Weekly charts

Year-end charts

Certifications

References

Gotham Records albums
Nikki Webster albums
2002 video albums